Furey is a surname. Notable people with this surname include:

Andrew Furey (born 1975), Canadian politician
Barney Furey (1886–1938), American actor
Clara Furey (born 1983), Canadian multidisciplinary artist
Chuck Furey (born 1954), Canadian former politician
Dick Furey (1925–1998), American professional basketball player
George Furey (born 1948), Canadian politician
Joe Furey, American comedian
John Furey (born 1951), American actor
John F. Furey (1906–1973), New York politician and judge
Kevin Furey (born 1983), Montana politician
Kirk Furey (born 1976), Canadian ice-hockey player
Lewis Furey (born 1949), Canadian musician
Maggie Furey (born 1955), English fantasy writer
Sean Furey (born 1982), American athlete

See also
The Fureys